The Second Battle of Ushant was a naval battle fought between French and British squadrons near Ushant, an island off the coast of Brittany, on 12 December 1781, as part of the American Revolutionary War.

Background
On 10 December 1781 a French convoy sailed from Brest with reinforcements and stores for the East and West Indies, protected by a fleet of 19 ships of the line commanded by Comte de Guichen. 

On 11 December 1781 Bussy-Castelnau departed Cadiz, Spain, with a squadron comprising the 64-gun Saint-Michel and the 74-gun Illustre, escorting three transports, to make his junction at Tenerife in the Canary Islands with the squadron under Guichen. 

The next day they encountered a British squadron of ships of the line, commanded by Rear Admiral Richard Kempenfelt in HMS Victory, that had been ordered to sea to intercept the expected convoy.

Action
On 12 December Kempenfelt's squadron sighted the French convoy, discovering that its protective escort had been strengthened.

Initially, Guichen's fleet was situated downwind of the convoy, allowing the British ships to sweep down and capture 15 ships carrying troops and supplies before the French ships could intervene.

Kempenfelt's force was not strong enough to attack the 19 French escorts, but the French convoy, having deliberately risked setting sail in the North Atlantic storm season in an unsuccessful attempt to avoid British forces, was dispersed in a gale shortly afterwards, and most of the ships forced to return to port.

Aftermath
Only two of the ships of the line intended for the West Indies arrived with a few transport vessels in time for the Battle of the Saintes in April 1782.

When news of the battle at Ushant reached Britain, the Opposition in Parliament questioned the decision to send such a small force against the convoy, and forced an official inquiry into the administration of the Royal Navy. This was the first of a succession of Opposition challenges that would ultimately bring about the fall of the government of Lord North on 20 March 1782 and pave the way for the Peace of Paris the following year, which ended the American Revolutionary War.

The French transports Marquis de Castries and Neptune-Royal, lone survivors of the convoy, reached Saint Croix carrying siege artillery and an artillery company.

References

Sources
 
 

Conflicts in 1781
Ushant 1781
Military history of Brittany
1781 in France
Battle